The 1996 NBA playoffs was the postseason tournament of the National Basketball Association's 1995–96 season. The tournament concluded with the Eastern Conference champion Chicago Bulls defeating the Western Conference champion Seattle SuperSonics 4 games to 2. Michael Jordan was named NBA Finals MVP for a then record fourth time.

Overview
The Chicago Bulls entered the NBA playoffs with a record of 72-10 (the best regular season record until the 2016 Golden State Warriors went 73-9), eclipsing the 1972 Los Angeles Lakers record of 69–13, helped by Michael Jordan’s first full season back from his mid-1990’s retirement and the addition of another future Hall of Famer to the Bulls, Dennis Rodman. The SuperSonics were only the tenth team in NBA history to win 64 games during the regular season, but their feat went largely unnoticed due to Chicago's record 72 wins.

This was the Sacramento Kings' first playoff appearance since 1986, but would be Mitch Richmond's only one as a King (he previously appeared twice in the playoffs for the Golden State Warriors in 1989 and 1991). The Kings did not make it back until 1999, which began their eight-year string of playoff appearances. Richmond would be traded to the Wizards in 1998 and would later win his first and only championship with the Lakers in 2002 (he would retire shortly thereafter).

Game 4 of the Lakers-Rockets series was Magic Johnson’s final NBA game. He would retire for good after a brief in-season comeback following the loss.

As for the two-time defending NBA champion Houston Rockets, their quest for a 3-peat was thwarted by the Seattle SuperSonics, who swept the Rockets 4-0 in the Western Conference Semifinals. The SuperSonics were also the last team to defeat the Rockets in the playoffs before their two-year title run, in the 1993 Western Conference Semifinals (Seattle won 4–3). Also noted during their two-year title run, the Rockets never faced the SuperSonics in the playoffs as they were eliminated in the first round by both the Denver Nuggets and the Los Angeles Lakers, respectively.

The 1996 Eastern Conference Finals between the Chicago Bulls and Orlando Magic were redemption for Michael Jordan after his first return to the playoffs in 1995 and the Bulls' disappointing second-round loss to the 1995 Orlando Magic, a team that would be swept in last year’s finals. With Jordan leading the way, the Bulls swept the defending Eastern Conference champion Magic, winning all four games by an average of 17 points. As for the Magic, it ended a three-year run of dominance for the team, as Shaquille O'Neal went on to sign with the Lakers the following season. The Magic did not have another 50-win season, division title and first round playoff series victory until 2008, followed the season afterward by an Eastern Conference championship and the franchise's second NBA Finals appearance in 2009 to which they lost to the Lakers.

With their Western Conference Finals victory over the Utah Jazz, the Seattle SuperSonics made the NBA Finals for the first time since 1979. With the win, the SuperSonics vindicated themselves as well after their stunning first-round loss to the Denver Nuggets in 1994, when they had become the first top seeded team to lose to an eighth-seed in the NBA playoffs. Despite the Jazz losing in seven games to the SuperSonics in the Western Conference Finals (their third appearance in 5 years), in retrospect it kickstarted their own Finals run, which they ultimately accomplished in 1997 and 1998, but lost both times to the Bulls.

By winning their fourth title in six years, the Bulls capped what many consider to be the greatest season in NBA history, finishing with a combined 87-13 record, including 72-10 in the regular season and 15-3 in the postseason. In addition, they remain the first and only team to win 70+ games in the regular season and win the NBA championship.

Bracket

Playoff qualifying

Western Conference

Best record in conference

The Seattle SuperSonics clinched the best record in the Western Conference, and had home court advantage throughout the Western Conference playoffs.

Clinched a playoff berth
The following teams clinched a playoff berth in the West:

Seattle SuperSonics (64-18, clinched Pacific division)
San Antonio Spurs (59-23, clinched Midwest division)
Utah Jazz (55-27)
Los Angeles Lakers (53-29)
Houston Rockets (48-34)
Portland Trail Blazers (44-38)
Phoenix Suns (41-41)
Sacramento Kings (39-43)

Eastern Conference

Best record in NBA
The Chicago Bulls clinched the best record in the NBA, and earned home court advantage throughout the entire playoffs.

Clinched a playoff berth
The following teams clinched a playoff berth in the East:

Chicago Bulls (72-10)
Orlando Magic (60-22, clinched Atlantic division)
Indiana Pacers (52-30)
Cleveland Cavaliers (47-35)
New York Knicks (47-35)
Atlanta Hawks (46-36)
Detroit Pistons (46-36)
Miami Heat (42-40)

Notes
 For the fourth straight postseason, both #5 seeds beat their #4 seeded opponent in the first round.

First round

Eastern Conference first round

(1) Chicago Bulls vs. (8) Miami Heat

This was the second playoff meeting between these two teams, with the Bulls winning the first meeting.

(2) Orlando Magic vs. (7) Detroit Pistons

This was the first playoff meeting between the Pistons and the Magic.

(3) Indiana Pacers vs. (6) Atlanta Hawks

This was the fourth playoff meeting between these two teams, with the Pacers winning two of the first three meetings.

(4) Cleveland Cavaliers vs. (5) New York Knicks

This was the third playoff meeting between these two teams, with the Knicks winning the first two meetings.

Western Conference first round

(1) Seattle SuperSonics vs. (8) Sacramento Kings

This was the first playoff meeting between the Kings and the SuperSonics.

(2) San Antonio Spurs vs. (7) Phoenix Suns

This was the third playoff meeting between these two teams, with the Suns winning the first two meetings.

(3) Utah Jazz vs. (6) Portland Trail Blazers

This was the fourth playoff meeting between these two teams, with the Trail Blazers winning two of the first three meetings.

(4) Los Angeles Lakers vs. (5) Houston Rockets

Game 4 is Magic Johnson's final NBA game.

This was the fifth playoff meeting between these two teams, with each team winning two series apiece.

Conference semifinals

Eastern Conference semifinals

(1) Chicago Bulls vs. (5) New York Knicks

Bill Wennington hits the game-winner with 36.9 seconds left.

This was the seventh playoff meeting between these two teams, with the Bulls winning five of the first six meetings.

(2) Orlando Magic vs. (6) Atlanta Hawks

This was the first playoff meeting between the Hawks and the Magic.

Western Conference semifinals

(1) Seattle SuperSonics vs. (5) Houston Rockets

This was the fifth playoff meeting between these two teams, with the SuperSonics winning the first four meetings.

(2) San Antonio Spurs vs. (3) Utah Jazz

This was the second playoff meeting between these two teams, with the Jazz winning the first meeting.

Conference finals

Eastern Conference finals

(1) Chicago Bulls vs. (2) Orlando Magic

Chicago overcame an 18-point lead by the Magic to win (64–46).

This was the second playoff meeting between these two teams, with the Magic winning the first meeting.

Western Conference finals

(1) Seattle SuperSonics vs. (3) Utah Jazz

The SuperSonics led the series 3-1 after an 88–86 victory at the Delta Center in Game 4. However, the Jazz shocked the Sonics in Seattle in Game 5 98-95 and would handily win Game 6 118-83, Seattle's worst playoff loss in team history. Game 7 was a close affair and the Sonics pulled away late to win 90-86 and advance to their first NBA Finals since 1979.  This is the most recent conference final played entirely outside of Texas and California.

This was the third playoff meeting between these two teams, with each team winning one series apiece.

NBA Finals: (E1) Chicago Bulls vs. (W1) Seattle SuperSonics

Seattle battled to a Game 6 after trailing 3-0 in the series, only the second team in NBA Finals history to do so (1951 New York Knicks forced a Game 7).

This was the first playoff meeting between the Bulls and the SuperSonics.

References

External links
Basketball-Reference.com's 1996 Playoffs section

National Basketball Association playoffs
Playoffs
Sports in Portland, Oregon

fi:NBA-kausi 1995–1996#Pudotuspelit